Funplex is the seventh studio album (eighth overall) by The B-52s, recorded during 2006 and 2007. The album was released on March 25, 2008, by Astralwerks Records. It was the first album of new material the group had released since Good Stuff in 1992, although the band did record two new songs for their 1998 compilation album Time Capsule: Songs for a Future Generation.

Single releases 
The first single from the album was released digitally on January 29, 2008, and is the title track, "Funplex". A music video was filmed in West Hollywood on March 1, 2008, and featured a cameo appearance by RuPaul, who had previously appeared in the video for "Love Shack".

Funplex debuted at number 11 on the U.S. Billboard 200 chart, selling about 30,000 copies in its first week.

The second single from the album was "Juliet of the Spirits".

Alternate versions 
The CD, packed in the Digipak format, was released in three, front cover color variants of the lettering in the album title and the band's shadows: the original (shown above) in gray, multi-colored, and hot pink. In the colored versions, the coloring covers the band's instruments while the band members themselves, along with the band's logotype, retain their original rendering throughout all versions.

Exclusive, limited-edition autographed copies were offered by Newbury Comics and FYE, as well during the Funplex 2008 tour, and a special limited-edition double-disc set of Funplex was available only at Target stores in the US. The bonus disc features five live tracks recorded at the band's November 16, 2007, concert at the Roxy in Los Angeles. Two additional live tracks from that same concert were available exclusively on iTunes.

Track listing
All songs written and arranged by the B-52s; music by Keith Strickland; and lyrics and vocal melodies by Kate Pierson, Fred Schneider, and Cindy Wilson.
"Pump" – 4:53
"Hot Corner" – 3:24
"Ultraviolet" – 4:25
"Juliet of the Spirits" – 4:22
"Funplex" – 4:07
"Eyes Wide Open" – 5:35
"Love in the Year 3000" – 4:14
"Deviant Ingredient" – 4:50
"Too Much to Think About" – 3:47
"Dancing Now" – 4:02
"Keep This Party Going" – 4:31

iTunes-exclusive deluxe version bonus tracks
"Private Idaho" (Live at the Roxy) – 4:00
"Planet Claire" (Live at the Roxy) – 5:28

Target-exclusive bonus CD: Live at the Roxy in L.A.
"Party Out of Bounds" – 3:45
"Channel Z" – 5:26
"Roam" – 5:13
"Strobe Light" – 4:38
"Rock Lobster" – 5:33

Personnel

The B-52s
Fred Schneider – vocals, cowbell (track 6)
Kate Pierson – vocals
Cindy Wilson – vocals
Keith Strickland – guitars, keyboards, programming, bass (tracks 1-2 & 11)

Additional musicians
Tracy Wormworth – bass (tracks 1, 3, 8 & 11)
Zachary Alford – drums (tracks 1, 3, 5, & 8-9)
Sterling Campbell – drums (tracks 2, 6-7 & 10-11)
Steve Osbourne – organ (tracks 1 & 3), bass & timpani (track 9)
Pete Davis – keyboards, synth programming (tracks 2, 4, 6-8 & 10-11) drum programming (tracks 4 & 7)
Dave McCracken – programming (tracks 5 & 9)
Damian Taylor – effects programming (tracks 1, 3, 5, & 8-9)
Sharon Adl-Doost – intro vocal (track 1)

Production
Producer: Steve Osborne
Engineers: Dan Austin, Rick Morris, Pete Davis, Keith Strickland, Kris Sampson
Mixing: Steve Osborne
Mastering: Bob Ludwig

Artwork
Art direction and design: Jeri Heiden & John Heiden
Photography: Joseph Cultice
Hair: Gerard Kelly
Make-up: Kristofer Buckle
Stylist: Robert Molnar

Chart performance

Album

Singles

References 

The B-52's albums
2008 albums
Albums produced by Steve Osborne
Astralwerks albums